Xirang, also known as hsi-jang, Swelling Earth, self-renewing soil, breathing earth, and living earth is a magical substance in Chinese mythology that had a self-expanding ability to continuously grow – which made it particularly effective for use by Gun and Yu the Great in fighting the rising waters of the Great Flood. This Chinese word compounds xí  "breathe; cease; rest; grow; multiply" and rǎng  "soil; earth". Noting similarities with earth-diver creation myths, Anne Birrell translates xirang as "self-renewing soil", and compares other translations of "breathing earth" (Wolfram Eberhard), "swelling mold" (Derk Bodde), "idle soil" (Roger Greatrex), and "living earth" or "breathing earth" (Rémi Mathieu).

In some versions of the myths, Gun stole the xirang from the Shangdi, who sent Zhu Rong to execute him in punishment, on Feather Mountain. According to some accounts, Yu, on the other hand, went up to Heaven. After begging Shangdi, he received from him a gift of as much xirang as his magical black tortoise could carry on its back, thus allowing Yu to successfully block up the 233,559 springs, the sources of the flood waters. In other versions of these myths, xirang was stolen or obtained from the Primordial Divinity, or Gun's executioner was other than Zhu Rong.

A historical basis has been suggested for both the Great Flood and for xirang. Hawkes proposes that the myths are a symbolic interpretation of a societal transition. In this case, Gun represents a society at an earlier technological stage, which engages in small-scale agriculture which involves raising areas of arable land sufficiently above the level of the marshes. The "magically-expanding" xirang soil may represent a type of raised garden, made up of soil, brushwood, and similar materials. Yu and his work in controlling the flood would symbolize a later type of society, which allowed a much larger scale approach to transforming wetlands to arable fields.

A less mythical explanation could be sought in various forms of expansive clay.  Generally impervious to water, clays are useful in creating the core of earthen dams.  Expansive clays, in particular, slowly expand when wetted, thus matching the "swelling" translation.  When dried, they take on a puffy "popcorn" look, which could be interpreted as "breathing" or airy.  Such clays are abundant in the Shaanxi Province where many of these events are thought to have occurred.

Comparative mythology
The xirang mythology has interesting parallels to the mythologies of the indigenous peoples of the Americas, particularly the earth-diver creation myth. In the earth-diver myth, the primordial waters cover all, until after overcoming great perils, a certain creature is able to dive down into the waters and retrieve a small bit of magical soil. This xirang-like soil then magically expands into the land areas of today.

See also
 Chinese mythology

Notes

Chinese mythology
Yaoguai
Mythological substances